Nancy binti Shukri (Jawi: ننسي بنت شكري; born 5 August 1961) is a Malaysian politician from the Parti Pesaka Bumiputera Bersatu (PBB), a component party of the Gabungan Parti Sarawak (GPS). She has served as Minister of Women, Family and Community Development in the Pakatan Harapan (PH) administration under Prime Minister Anwar Ibrahim since December 2022 and the Member of Parliament (MP) for Santubong since November 2022. She served as the Minister of Tourism, Arts and Culture for the second term in the Barisan Nasional (BN) administration under former Prime Minister Ismail Sabri Yaakob from August 2021 to the collapse of the BN administration in November 2022 and her first term in the Perikatan Nasional (PN) administration under former Prime Minister Muhyiddin Yassin from March 2020 to August 2021 and the MP for Batang Sadong from March 2008 to November 2022. She served as Minister in the Prime Minister's Department and Minister of Plantation Industries and Commodities in the BN administration under former Prime Minister Najib Razak from May 2013 to May 2018.

Political career
Nancy was elected to Parliament in the 2008 Malaysian general election for the rural conservative seat of Batang Sadong, in southern Sarawak state.

After successfully defending her seat in the 2013 Malaysian general election, Nancy was appointed as Minister in the Prime Minister's Department in the new Cabinet of Malaysia announced by then Prime Minister of Malaysia, Najib Razak.

Personal life
Nancy was born on 5 August 1961 in Kuching, Sarawak to Bibi McPherson and Shukri Mahidi. She has Malay and Melanau ancestry on her father's side while her mother has Scottish, Iban and Chinese ancestry. She is married with three children and currently living in Kuching, Sarawak. Nancy is the tenth of eleven siblings.

Election results

Honours
  :
  Officer of the Order of the Defender of the Realm (KMN) (2010)
  :
 Grand Knight of the Order of Sultan Ahmad Shah of Pahang (SSAP) – Dato' Sri (2016)
  :
  Commander of the Order of the Star of Hornbill Sarawak (PGBK) – Datuk (2016)
  Knight Commander of the Most Exalted Order of the Star of Sarawak (PNBS) – Dato Sri (2021)

See also
 Batang Sadong (federal constituency)

References

External links

 

1961 births
Living people
People from Kuching
Malaysian people of Scottish descent
Malaysian people of Malay descent
Malaysian people of Chinese descent
Melanau people
Iban people
Malaysian Muslims
Parti Pesaka Bumiputera Bersatu politicians
Members of the Dewan Rakyat
Women members of the Dewan Rakyat
Women in Sarawak politics
Government ministers of Malaysia
Women government ministers of Malaysia
Alumni of the University of Hull
Officers of the Order of the Defender of the Realm
Knights Commander of the Most Exalted Order of the Star of Sarawak
Commanders of the Order of the Star of Hornbill Sarawak
21st-century Malaysian politicians
21st-century Malaysian women politicians